Lisa Ann Raphals (born May 15, 1951) is an American professor of Chinese and comparative literature at University of California, Riverside, and of philosophy at the National University of Singapore. She compares  early China and ancient Greece.  She is the author of a number of books, including Knowing Words: Wisdom and Cunning in the Classical Traditions of China and Greece and Sharing the Light: Representations of Women and Virtue in Early China, as well as a collection of poems and translations entitled What Country.

Raphals is married to John C. Baez, who is a professor of mathematics at UCR.

Selected works 

 *

References 

1951 births
University of California, Riverside faculty
Living people
20th-century American women writers
21st-century American women writers
20th-century American non-fiction writers
21st-century American non-fiction writers
Academic staff of the National University of Singapore
Comparative literature academics
American women academics